KJBO-LD (channel 35) is a low-power television station in Wichita Falls, Texas, United States, affiliated with MyNetworkTV. It is owned by Nexstar Media Group alongside NBC affiliate KFDX-TV (channel 3); Nexstar also provides certain services Fox affiliate KJTL (channel 18) under joint sales and shared services agreements (JSA/SSA) with Mission Broadcasting. The three stations share studios near Seymour Highway (US 277) and Turtle Creek Road in Wichita Falls; KJBO-LD's transmitter is located near Arrowhead Drive and Onaway Trail (near Seymour Highway) southwest of the city.

Although KJBO-LD broadcasts a digital signal of its own, due to its low-power status, the station's broadcasting radius does not reach the entire Wichita Falls–Lawton market. Therefore, KJBO-LD is simulcast on KFDX-TV's second digital subchannel (channel 3.2)—which also transmits from the Seymour Highway facility—in order to reach Lawton and surrounding areas of southwestern Oklahoma and northwest Texas not covered by the channel 35 signal. Ever since its inception, the KFDX-DT2 simulcast of KJBO-LP/LD had been presented in 480i standard definition, with most programs (including the MyNetworkTV prime time schedule) airing in letterboxed 4:3; however, sometime in 2020, it was upgraded to 1080i high definition.

History

Early history
The station first signed on the air on October 4, 1988 as K35BO, which originally operated as an independent station. In 1993, the station was acquired by the Epic Broadcasting Corporation, a transaction which made it the sister station to Fox affiliate KJTL (channel 18).

UPN affiliation; JSA/SSA with KFDX-TV
On January 16, 1995, channel 35 became a charter affiliate of the United Paramount Network (UPN), which was created as a partnership between Paramount Television and Chris-Craft/United Television. Outside of UPN prime time programming, the station otherwise continued to maintain a general entertainment programming format. Alongside UPN prime time programming, channel 35 initially carried some recent off-network sitcoms and drama series, movies on weekend afternoons and evenings, children's programming, and some first-run syndicated shows.

In May 1995, Epic announced it would sell KJTL and K35BO as well as the Amarillo, Texas duopoly of fellow Fox affiliate KCIT and low-powered K65GD (now MyNetworkTV affiliate KCPN-LD) to New York City–based Wicks Broadcast Group – then a primarily radio-based broadcasting division of private equity firm The Wicks Group, which intended the purchases to be a stepping stone to build a group of middle-market television stations complementary to its nine existing radio properties – for $14 million; the sale was finalized on August 31, 1995. In 1996, the station adopted a conventional callsign as KJBO-LP.

On January 6, 1999, Wicks sold the station to Bexley, Ohio-based Mission Broadcasting for $15.5 million. The acquisition of KJTL and KJBO was among the first station acquisitions for Mission (part of a four-station transaction that also involved the purchases of KCIT and KCPN-LP); developed as an arm of its creditor Bastet Broadcasting, the group had formed partnerships with the Nexstar Broadcasting Group and Quorum Broadcasting to operate many of Mission's stations in markets that did not have enough television stations to allow a legal duopoly between two commercial outlets. In the Wichita Falls–Lawton market, Nexstar had been the owner of KFDX-TV since January 1998, when the Irving, Texas-based company acquired the NBC affiliate from U.S. Broadcast Group as part of a $64-million, three-station deal.

Nexstar took over the operations of KJTL and KJBO on June 1, 1999, under joint sales and shared services agreements with Mission, under which KFDX would handle news production, engineering, security and certain other services as well as handling advertising sales for the two stations.

As a MyNetworkTV affiliate

On January 24, 2006, the respective parent companies of UPN and The WB, CBS Corporation and the Warner Bros. Entertainment division of Time Warner, announced that they would dissolve the two networks to create The CW Television Network, a joint venture between the two media companies that initially featured programs from its two predecessor networks as well as new series specifically produced for The CW. Subsequently, on February 22, 2006, News Corporation announced the launch of MyNetworkTV, a network operated by Fox Television Stations and its syndication division Twentieth Television that was created to primarily to provide network programming to UPN and WB stations that The CW decided against affiliating based on their local viewership standing in comparison to the outlet that The CW ultimately chose as its charter outlets, giving these stations another option besides converting to a general entertainment independent format. On March 30, in a joint announcement by the network and Nexstar Broadcasting Group/Mission Broadcasting, KJBO-LP was confirmed as MyNetworkTV's charter affiliate for the Wichita Falls-Lawton market. KJBO remained a UPN affiliate until September 4, 2006, with the network's Sunday late-night repeat block as the final UPN offering to be carried on the station. Channel 35 officially joined MyNetworkTV upon that network's launch on September 5, at which point KJBO changed its branding to "MyTV KJBO".

As a result of the network changes, "KWB", a cable-only affiliate of The WB (through its small-market network feed, The WB 100+ Station Group) available in the market on systems such as Fidelity Cablevision in Lawton and Time Warner Cable in Wichita Falls, was expected to affiliate with The CW; however, as a result of a deal between the network and Hoak Media that was announced on April 10, 2006, the CW affiliation instead went to CBS affiliate KAUZ-TV (channel 6)—which launched a digital subchannel affiliated with the network's small-market feed, The CW Plus, when the network debuted on September 17, assuming the operations of "KWB".

On March 26, 2021, the station flash-cut to digital and became KJBO-LD.

In July 2021, Nexstar exercised its option to acquire KJBO-LD outright from Mission. The transaction was completed on October 1.

Programming
Syndicated programs broadcast by KJBO include Access Hollywood, Judge Mathis, The People's Court, 2 Broke Girls, and TMZ on TV, among others.

References

External links
 
 

MyNetworkTV affiliates
Low-power television stations in the United States
JBO-LD
Television channels and stations established in 1988
1988 establishments in Texas
Nexstar Media Group